Frank Orlando Weary (1849 – 1921) was an architect based in Akron, Ohio. He joined in the partnership Weary & Kramer with George W. Kramer. Weary designed the Carroll County Courthouse in Carrollton, Ohio in  Second Empire style, which was recognized by listing on the National Register of Historic Places in 1974. He also designed the Akron Public Library (1904), a Carnegie library, also listed on the National Register. His brother Edwin D. Weary was also an architect, known for designing bank buildings in Chicago and partnering with W. H. Alford at Weary and Alford.

Biography
Weary was born in Sheboygan, Wisconsin in 1849 and moved with his family to Akron in 1851. Simon B. Weary, a carpenter and then wood product company owner, was his father.

From 1863, Weary served as a drummer boy in the Union Army during the American Civil War. He married Jennie Wise in 1881. They had four children.

Weary designed the Selle Wagon and Wheel Company building that became part of Selle Gear Works, Akron-Selle, and is now the home of Ohio Brewing Company.

Weary & Kramer
Weary partnered with George W. Kramer to form the firm Weary and Kramer, which also produced several NRHP listed buildings.

Works
Akron Public Library, 69 East Market Street in Akron, Ohio NRHP listed
Carroll County Courthouse (Ohio) at Courthouse Square in Carrollton, Ohio, NRHP listed
First Methodist Episcopal Church, 120 Cleveland Ave., SW Canton, Ohio , NRHP listed

The Gothic Building (1902) at 102 S. High St. & 52-58 E. Mill St. in Akron, NRHP listed
Selle Gear Company, 451 S. High Streer in Akron, NRHP listed
Residence of A and M. J. Allen (1878) in Akron
Akron Rural Cemetery Buildings at 150 Glendale Avenue in Akron Weary, NRHP listed 
Glendale Cemetery Memorial Chapel
Soldiers lodge and memorial chapel
Akron Savings Bank building
Beacon Block at Main Street and Mill Street
Central High School (Akron, Ohio)
Soldiers Memorial in Akron

Weary and Kramer
(with attribution)
 Hancock County Courthouse in Courthouse Square, Findlay, Ohio, NRHP-listed
 Andrews United Methodist Church at 95 Richmond Street in Brooklyn, New York (Kramer & Weary),  NRHP-listed
 First United Methodist Church (Birmingham, Alabama), 6th Ave. and 19th St., N. 
 Baptist Temple at 360 Schermerhorn Street in Brooklyn, New York, NRHP-listed
One or more works in Findlay Downtown Historic District, Findlay, Ohio (Weary & Kramer), NRHP-listed

References

1849 births
1921 deaths
American male drummers
People from Akron, Ohio
People from Sheboygan, Wisconsin
Architects from Ohio
Architects from Wisconsin
Union Army soldiers
People of Ohio in the American Civil War